The Putnișoara is a right tributary of the river Putna (Suceava basin) in Suceava County, Romania. It discharges into the Putna in the village Putna.

References

Rivers of Romania
Rivers of Suceava County